Francesco Barbaro may refer to:

 Francesco Barbaro (politician) (1390–1454), Italian politician, diplomat and humanist from Venice
 Francesco Barbaro (patriarch of Aquileia) (1546–1616), Venetian diplomat and Italian Catholic bishop
 Francesco Barbaro (Castanu) (1927–2018), boss of the 'Ndrangheta, a Mafia-type criminal organisation based in Calabria, Italy